The 1987 Champ Car season may refer to:
 the 1986–87 USAC Championship Car season, which was just one race, the 71st Indianapolis 500 
 the 1987 CART PPG Indy Car World Series, sanctioned by CART, who would later become Champ Car